Roshown McLeod (born November 17, 1975) is an American former professional basketball player who was selected by the Atlanta Hawks in the first round (20th pick overall) of the 1998 NBA draft. A 6'8" small forward from St. John's University and Duke University, McLeod played in three NBA seasons from 1999 to 2001. He played for the Hawks and briefly for the Philadelphia 76ers. In the 2001–02 season he was a member of the Boston Celtics but was permanently injured and unable to play. Due to this injury he had to prematurely finish his career.

McLeod played high school basketball at St. Anthony High School in Jersey City.

Roshown at the time was a rare example of a player who transferred from one school to another. McLeod had trouble breaking into the lineup at St. John's. He was the first transfer accepted by Duke coach Mike Krzyzewski.
In his NBA career, McLeod played in 113 games and scored a total of 817 points. On November 14, 2000, as a member of the Hawks, he scored a career-high 24 points versus the Orlando Magic.

In September 2002, McLeod was named an assistant basketball coach for Fairfield University.

In August 2008, McLeod joined Tom Crean's coaching staff at Indiana University. McLeod was dismissed from IU by Crean on March 7, 2010.

Roshown replaced Dan Hurley at St. Benedict's Preparatory School, an independent school in Newark, New Jersey, after Hurley took the head job at Wagner College in April 2010. He resigned from St. Benedict's in April 2011.
In 2016, he was the head coach of Fellowship Christian School, a private school in Roswell, Georgia. As of March, McLeod left Fellowship Christian School for a difference of opinions.

Personal

In an interview with CBS Radio, McLeod told Brandon Scoop B Robinson that Michael Jordan serenaded Jerry Stackhouse while scoring 48 points on him during an NBA game, by singing Anita Baker hit "Giving You the Best That I Got".

References

External links
 

1975 births
Living people
American men's basketball coaches
American men's basketball players
Atlanta Hawks draft picks
Atlanta Hawks players
Basketball coaches from New Jersey
Basketball players from Jersey City, New Jersey
Duke Blue Devils men's basketball players
Indiana Hoosiers men's basketball coaches
Philadelphia 76ers players
Small forwards
Sportspeople from Jersey City, New Jersey
St. John's Red Storm men's basketball players